Τραχεῖα/Tracheia, meaning "rugged" in Greek, was used as a toponym for several entities

 Ancient fortress on the shore of the Black Sea, sometimes identified with Anacopia (modern New Athos)
 Uninhabited island belonging to Diapontia Islands
 Cilicia Tracheia, a part of Cilicia

See also
 trachea for the windpipe.